Indonesia and South Africa established diplomatic relations in August 1994. The South African Embassy in Jakarta was established in January 1995, and Indonesia opened its embassy in Pretoria in 1995.
Both nations are members of the World Trade Organization (WTO) and G-20 major economies. In 2012, during a briefing on Foreign Policy initiatives for 2012, Indonesia named South Africa amongst its 14 strategic partners and Dutch Colonial Period East Indies Overseas Countries (Including Dutch Speaking Countries Outside Netherlands Kingdom). 

According to a 2013 BBC World Service Poll, Indonesians' perception of South Africa are divided between 36% a negative view, and 33% expressing a positive one, this is about the same as global average opinion on South Africa.

History 

Although formal diplomatic relations were only established in the 1990s, the historical links between Indonesia and South Africa go back to the 17th century. In 1693 Sheikh Yusuf from Makassar was exiled to the Cape of Good Hope, because he assisted Banten Sultan Ageng Tirtayasa's rebellion against the Dutch. At that time, the Dutch colonized both the Cape of Good Hope (now the city of Cape Town) and the Dutch East Indies (centered in Batavia). Yusuf's arrival in Cape Town established the Malay Muslim community in South Africa, as the town served as a penal settlement for convicts and political exiles from East Indies.

During the Apartheid period, Indonesia joined the rest of the Asian countries in avoiding official relations with South Africa, however in 1968, Indonesia unofficially opened secret military and intelligence relations with South Africa through the Estado Novo regime of Portugal as well as through Israel. It was widely known that from 1968-69 onwards, Indonesia shared intelligence with South Africa and Israel through Portugal, Iran, and Turkey

Indonesian-South African relations were formalized through the establishment of diplomatic relations in August 1994. The South African Embassy in Jakarta was established in January 1995 and officially opened by the former Minister of Foreign Affairs, Mr A Nzo, on 14 July 1997. The South African Embassy in Jakarta is also accredited to ASEAN in order to maintain close interaction with the regional body, and also accredited to Timor Leste since 2009 on a non-residential basis.

Trade and commerce
South Africa is Indonesia's largest trade partner in Africa which accounted for 22.18 percent of Indonesia's total trade with Africa in 2011. Trade between the two countries has seen a steady increase over the past few years and has the potential to grow. Bilateral trade between the two countries reached US$2.14 billion in 2011. Indonesia's exports were valued at US$1.44 billion in 2011 while imports were around US$705.78 million, resulting in a US$730.81 million trade surplus in favour of Indonesia. The South African market is one of Indonesia's key non-traditional markets, which is expected to drive future exports.

Notes

External links
Embassy of the Republic of Indonesia in Pretoria, South Africa
The Embassy of South Africa in Jakarta, Indonesia

 
South Africa
Bilateral relations of South Africa